The Go-Getter is a 1923 American silent comedy film directed by Edward H. Griffith and written by Peter B. Kyne and John Lynch. The film stars T. Roy Barnes, Seena Owen, William Norris, Tom Lewis, Louis Wolheim, and Fred Huntley. The film, which is based upon the short story "The Go-Getter" by Peter B. Kyne, was released April 8, 1923, by Paramount Pictures. A fragmentary print of the film is held in a private collection.

Cast
T. Roy Barnes as Bill Peck
Seena Owen	as Mary Skinner
William Norris as Cappy Ricks
Tom Lewis as Charles Skinner
Louis Wolheim as Daniel Silver
Fred Huntley as Jack Morgan
John Carr as Joe Ryan
Frank Currier as Hugh McNair
William Sorelle as Mayor Healey 
William J. MacMillan as Pilot
Jane Jennings

References

External links

1923 films
1920s English-language films
Silent American comedy films
1923 comedy films
Paramount Pictures films
Films directed by Edward H. Griffith
American black-and-white films
American silent feature films
1920s American films